The following are the national records in Olympic weightlifting in Albania. Records are maintained in each weight class for the snatch lift, clean and jerk lift, and the total for both lifts by the Albanian Weightlifting Federation.

Men

Women

References

External links

Albania
Records
Olympic weightlifting
weightlifting